Jessica Christina Farrar (born November 26, 1966) is an American politician and a former Democratic member of the Texas House of Representatives. She was first elected to the legislature in 1994 at the age of twenty-seven and was the longest serving Hispanic member of the House from Harris County, Texas. She served as the representative for House District 148. She resigned her House seat effective September 30, 2019.

Farrar served as the vice-chairman of the House Committee on Judiciary & Civil Jurisprudence and was a member on the House Committee on State Affairs. In addition, Representative Farrar served as the chairwoman of the Texas House Women's Health Caucus. During the 82nd Legislative session, she served as the head of the Texas House Democratic Caucus.

Early life and education
Reared in Houston, Farrar graduated in 1984 from Lamar High School. She received a Bachelor of Architecture from the University of Houston and a Juris Doctor from the University of Texas School of Law in Austin.

Texas House of Representatives

In the general election held on November 6, 2018, Farrar won her eighteenth consecutive term in the state House. With 32,147 votes (67.9 percent), she defeated the Republican candidate, Ryan Taylor McConnico (born July 15, 1989), who received 15,213 (32.1 percent).

Past committees
74th Legislative Session
Corrections
Criminal Jurisprudence
75th Legislative Session
Corrections
Criminal Jurisprudence
Rules & Resolutions
76th Legislative Session
Appropriations
Corrections
77th Legislative Session
Appropriations
Corrections – Vice Chair
78th Legislative Session
Corrections
County Affairs
79th Legislative Session
Agriculture & Livestock
State Affairs
80th Legislative Session
Juvenile Justice & Family Issues
State Affairs
81st Legislative Session
Environmental Regulation
Land & Resource Management – Vice Chair
82nd Legislative Session
Environmental Regulation – Vice Chair
Border and Intergovernmental Affairs – Member
83rd Legislative Session
House Committee on Judiciary and Civil Jurisprudence – Vice-Chair
House Committee on State Affairs – Member

Caucuses
Texas Women's Health Caucus – founder and Chairwoman
House Democratic Caucus – Member
Texas Veterans' Caucus – Member
Legislative Study Group – Member
Texas Farm-to-Table Caucus – Member
Education Caucus – Member
Fine Arts Education Caucus – Member
Young Texans Legislative Caucus – Member
National Hispanic Caucus of State Legislators – Member
Mexican American Legislative Caucus – Member

Notable legislation
Each legislative session, Farrar introduces a bill to abolish the death penalty in Texas.

In 2003, Farrar sponsored legislation that would prohibit employment discrimination based upon sexual orientation or gender identity.

In 2009, she proposed a bill that would recognize postpartum psychosis as a defense for mothers who kill their infants.  Under the terms of the proposed legislation, if jurors concluded that a mother's "judgment was impaired as a result of the effects of giving birth or the effects of lactation following the birth," they would be allowed to convict her of the crime of infanticide, rather than murder.  The maximum penalty for infanticide would be two years in prison. Farrar's introduction of this bill prompted liberal bioethics scholar Jacob M. Appel to call her "the bravest politician in America."

In 2011, Farrar introduced legislation that would prohibit peace officers from inquiring as to the immigration or nationality status of a witness or victim in a criminal investigation.

In March 2017, Farrar proposed a bill to fine men for masturbation and require consultations and medically-unnecessary examinations before vasectomies, colonoscopies, and the prescription of Viagra tablets. The bill is a response to what Farrar calls "the obstacles that Texas women face every day, that were placed there by legislatures making it very difficult for them to access health care." Farrar said that masturbation could be deemed "an act against an unborn child" and a "failure to preserve the sanctity of life."

The Killer Ds

In May 2003, Farrar helped to organize a group of House Democrats who left Texas for Ardmore, Oklahoma. The absence of fifty-two House Democrats prevented Republicans from obtaining a quorum and hence blocked passage of the redistricting plan during the 2003 regular session. The Killer Ds were followed by a group of eleven state senators, called the Texas Eleven, who fled the state in August 2003 for the same purposes.

Community involvement
Farrar founded a non-profit mentorship and educational program for Latina college students known as Latinas on the Rise in 1998, and she serves on the board of directors. In 2001, she authored a bill to create the Greater Northside Management District, a group dedicated to promoting the economic development and quality of life for commercial property owners and to creating opportunities for new development in portions of Farrar's district. She also co-founded the Texas Women's Health Foundation in 2007, a non-partisan non-profit aimed at de-politicizing women's health issues, and she serves as an ex-officio member of its board. 
 
Farrar also serves on the board of directors for Air Alliance Houston (formerly known as the Galveston-Houston Association for Smog Prevention), Avenue CDC, Rice Design Alliance, Women Action for New Direction Education Fund, and the National Advisory Committee of the National Latina Institute for Reproductive Health.  She also serves on the Postpartum Support International's President's Advisory Council.

References

External links
Texas House of Representatives – Jessica Farrar official TX House website
Project Vote Smart – Representative Jessica Farrar (TX) profile
Follow the Money – Jessica Farrar
2006 **2004 **2002 **2000

Living people
1966 births
Lamar High School (Houston, Texas) alumni
University of Houston alumni
University of Texas School of Law alumni
American women architects
People from Houston
Architects from Texas
20th-century American architects
20th-century American politicians
21st-century American politicians
Women state legislators in Texas
Democratic Party members of the Texas House of Representatives
20th-century American women politicians
21st-century American women politicians